Holy Spirit Catholic Church is a Roman Catholic parish in Fargo, North Dakota. The pastor is Rev. Ross Laframboise, and Rev. Sean Mulligan is the parochial vicar.

Schools 
Holy Spirit Church has three parochial schools.

Holy Spirit Elementary School 
Holy Spirit Elementary School serves students from prekindergarten to fifth grade, and has an enrollment of 150.

Sullivan Middle School 
Sullivan Middle School serves grades six to eight and has 230 students. It is located in a building that was completed in 2002, which it shares with Shanley High School.

Shanley High School 
Shanley High School opened in its current form in 1950, and has an enrollment of 330 students.

See also 
 Roman Catholic Diocese of Fargo

References 

Churches in North Dakota